Montreuil most often refers to Montreuil, Seine-Saint-Denis (aka Montreuil-sous-Bois), in the eastern suburbs of Paris, in the Seine-Saint-Denis département. 

It  may also refer to:

Communes of France
 Montreuil, Eure-et-Loir, in the Eure-et-Loir département
 Montreuil, Pas-de-Calais, or Montreuil-sur-Mer, in the Pas-de-Calais département
 Montreuil, Vendée, in the Vendée département
 Montreuil-au-Houlme, in the Orne département 
 Montreuil-aux-Lions, in the Aisne département 
 Montreuil-Bellay, in the Maine-et-Loire département 
 Montreuil-Bonnin, in the Vienne département 
 Montreuil-des-Landes, in the Ille-et-Vilaine département 
 Montreuil-en-Auge, in the Calvados département
 Montreuil-en-Caux, in the Seine-Maritime  département
 Montreuil-en-Touraine, in the Indre-et-Loire département 
 Montreuil-Juigné, in the Maine-et-Loire département 
 Montreuil-la-Cambe, in the Orne département 
 Montreuil-l'Argillé, in the Eure département 
 Montreuil-le-Chétif, in the Sarthe département 
 Montreuil-le-Gast, in the Ille-et-Vilaine département 
 Montreuil-le-Henri, in the Sarthe  département 
 Montreuil-Poulay, in the Mayenne  département
 Montreuil-sous-Pérouse, in the Ille-et-Vilaine département 
 Montreuil-sur-Barse, in the Aube département 
 Montreuil-sur-Blaise, in the Haute-Marne département 
 Montreuil-sur-Brêche, in the Oise département 
 Montreuil-sur-Epte, in the Val d'Oise département
 Montreuil-sur-Ille, in the Ille-et-Vilaine département 
 Montreuil-sur-Loir, in the Maine-et-Loire département 
 Montreuil-sur-Lozon, in the Manche département 
 Montreuil-sur-Maine, in the Maine-et-Loire département 
 Montreuil-sur-Thérain, in the Oise département 
 Montreuil-sur-Thonnance, in the Haute-Marne département

Other
 Arrondissement of Montreuil, in the Pas-de-Calais department in the Hauts-de-France region
 Canton of Montreuil, a former canton in the Pas-de-Calais department and the Nord-Pas de Calais region
 Domain of Montreuil, a parcel of land near Versailles and the official residence of Madame Élisabeth, granted to her by Louis XVI of France
 Montreuil Abbey, a Cistercian nunnery in Picardy, formerly known as Montreuil-les-Dames or Montreuil-en-Thiérache, later as Montreuil-sous-Laon, in the Aisne département
 Porte de Montreuil (Paris Métro), station
 Pierre de Montreuil (died 1267), French architect